The Primary Mathematics World Contest or PMWC takes place every year in Hong Kong. It was first held in 1997, and is sponsored by the Po Leung Kuk organization. The competition has attracted teams from around the world. Each team consists of 4 members, all of whom must be 13 or younger as of September 1, and must not be enrolled in a secondary institution (or the equivalent).
However, the 13th Primary Mathematics World Contest (2009) was canceled due to the WHO declaring the Influenza A virus subtype H1N1 a pandemic. A similar event occurred in the 7th Primary Mathematics World Contest (2003) where the committee postponed the contest to November 2003 due to SARS. The PMWC committee provides room and board at the Panda Hotel in Tsuen Wan.

Competitions in Hong Kong
Mathematics competitions
Po Leung Kuk
Recurring events established in 1997